Lewis Nockalls Cottingham (1787 – 13 October 1847) was a British architect who pioneered the study of Medieval Gothic architecture. He was a restorer and conservator of existing buildings. He set up a Museum of Medieval Art in Waterloo Road, London with a collection of artefacts from demolished buildings and plaster casts of the medieval sculpture.

Biography 

Cottingham was born in 1787 at Laxfield in Suffolk of a respectable family. He showed a talent for science and the arts early and he was apprenticed to a builder at Ipswich. After several years he moved to London and there placed himself with an architect and surveyor. He commenced his professional career in 1814 at his residence near Lincoln's Inn Fields. Cottingham's first public appointment was as architect and surveyor to the Cooks Company in 1822. Soon after this he erected a mansion in the perpendicular style of Gothic architecture for John Harrison at Snelston Hall in Derbyshire. In 1825 he became architect to Rochester Cathedral

Between  1814 and 1822 he  published several works illustrating medieval English architecture, including a set of plans  of Westminster Hall (1822) and a larger work on Henry VII's Chapel.  Charles Locke Eastlake described his working drawings of Gothic ornaments as "ill-selected and coarse in execution, but curious as being perhaps the first full-size illustrations of Mediaeval carving published in this form".

Cottingham won a competition to remodel the interior of the Chapel of Magdalen College, Oxford; work started in July 1829 and lasted at least six years; in the course of the restoration, a great deal of seventeenth and eighteenth century work was stripped away.

George Truefitt studied with Cottingham as an apprentice from 1839 to 1844, after which he worked briefly for two other members of the profession. 
Calvert Vaux became in 1843, an articled pupil of Cottingham, who was one of the elders of the English Gothic Revival, had supervised the sometimes overzealous restoration of a number of important medieval churches. Cottingham planned new streets and designed many urban dwellings in the Waterloo Bridge Road area on the Surrey side of London (where he built his own house); erected banks (the one in Bury St. Edmund's of 1844-1846 was most admired), hotels, and other commercial buildings; and published a book on Greek and Roman architecture.

He also supervised repairs at  Hereford Cathedral,  St Albans Abbey, and the Church of
St James at Louth.

Works and restorations 

 1822-30 Snelston Hall, Derbyshire (demolished 1951)
 1822-30 Snelston domestic houses
 1824-33 Estate at Waterloo Bridge Road, London
 1825-30 Rochester Cathedral
 1829-33 refitted Magdalen College Chapel, Oxford
 1830-47 Brougham Hall, Westmorland
 1831 Elvaston Castle, Derbyshire
 1832-33 St Albans Abbey (now the Cathedral and Abbey Church of St Alban)
 1833–41 St Patrick's Cathedral, Armagh
 1836-?? Theberton, Suffolk
 1841 St Oswald's Church, Ashbourne Derbyshire
 1841 Parish Church Great Chesterford, Essex
 1841 Parish Church Horningsheath, Suffolk
 1841-47 Hereford Cathedral
 1842 Parish Church Milton Bryan
 1842-47 St. Mary's Church, Bury St. Edmunds
 1843-44 St. Mary's Church, Nottingham - tower restoration
 1843-48 The Norman Tower, Bury St Edmunds - restoration 
 1844 St. James Church, Louth, Lincolnshire - spire restoration
 1846 St. Mary's Church, Clifton, Nottinghamshire
 1845 - 47 St Helen's Church, Thorney, Nottinghamshire. New church.
 1846 The former Savings Bank, Crown Street, Bury St Edmunds
 1846 Tuddenham School, Suffolk
 1846 Great Chesterford School, Essex
 1846 - 47 Parish Church Theberton, Suffolk
 1846 - 47 Parish Church Barrow, Suffolk
 1846 - 47 Parish Church Roos, Yorkshire
 1846 - 47 Brougham Chapel, Westmorland
 1847 Kilpeck, Herefordshire church restoration
 1847 Ledbury, Herefordshire church restoration

Family 

He married Sophia Cotton on 24 January 1821. They had 4 children.

 Nockalls Johnson Cottingham (1823–1854) who was also an architect. Nockalls Johnson was lost in the wreck of the SS Arctic on its way to New York City.
 Edwin Cotton Cottingham (1825–1876)
 Sophia Anne Cottingham (1827-1827)
 Sophia Sarah Jane Cottingham (1830–1867)

References

Literature 
 L.N.Cottingham (1787–1847): Architect of the Gothic Revival by Janet Myles

External links 
 Lewis Nockalls Cottingham (1787-1847)

1787 births
1847 deaths
19th-century English architects
Gothic Revival architects
English ecclesiastical architects
Architects of cathedrals
People from Mid Suffolk District
Architects from Suffolk